Akseki is a town and district of Antalya Province, Turkey.

Akseki is a Turkish place name that may also refer to the following places in Turkey:

 Akseki, Antalya, a village in the district of Akseki, Antalya Province
 Akseki, Bayramören
 Akseki, Bozdoğan, a village in the district of Bozdoğan, Aydın Province
 Akseki, İspir
 Akseki, Sivrice, a village of Sivrice district in Elazığ Province 
 Akseki, Taşköprü, a village
 Akseki, Tosya, a village